The 1983–84 season was Heart of Midlothian F.C.s first season of play back in the Scottish Premier Division, having gained promotion as runner-up of the 1982–83 Scottish First Division. Hearts also competed in the Scottish Cup and the League Cup.

Fixtures

Friendlies

League Cup

Scottish Cup

Scottish Premier Division

Scottish Premier Division table

Squad information

|}

See also
List of Heart of Midlothian F.C. seasons

References 

 Statistical Record 83-84

External links 
 Official Club website

Heart of Midlothian F.C. seasons
Heart of Midlothian